Wasco Lake is a glacially formed alpine lake located in Jefferson County, Oregon, United States.  A part of the Mount Jefferson Wilderness Area, Wasco Lake is a popular hiking destination and can be accessed via the Pacific Crest Trail.

In 2003, the devastating B&B Complex Fire hit the area of Wasco Lake.

Location 

References 

Geography of Jefferson County, Oregon
Lakes of Oregon